The Door in the Floor is a 2004 American drama film written and directed by Tod Williams. The screenplay is based on the first third of the 1998 novel A Widow for One Year by John Irving.

Plot
Set in an exclusive beach community on Long Island, where children's book author and artist Ted Cole lives with his wife Marion and their young daughter Ruth, usually supervised by her nanny Alice. Their walls are covered with photographs of the couple's teenage sons, who were killed in an automobile accident, which left Marion deeply depressed and the marriage in a shambles. The one shared experience that holds them together is Ruth's ritualistic daily viewing of a home gallery of the deceased sons.
 
Ted and Marion temporarily separate, each alternately living in the house and in a rented apartment in town. Ted hires Eddie O'Hare to work as his summer assistant and driver, since his own license was suspended for drunk driving.

An aspiring writer, Eddie admires Ted, but he soon finds the older man to be a self-absorbed womanizer with an erratic work schedule, leaving the young assistant to fill his time as best he can. Eddie and Marion soon get involved, which seems not to bother Ted, who enjoys trysts of his own with local resident Evelyn Vaughn (Mimi Rogers) while sketching her. When Ruth catches Eddie and her mother having sex, Ted becomes upset and advises Eddie he may have to testify about the incident if Ted needs to fight for custody.

Marion eventually leaves Ted and their daughter, taking with her all the photographs and negatives of their dead sons, except for the one being reframed after it was broken, injuring Ruth. Eddie takes the initiative to retrieve the picture so that Ruth can have at least one partial image of her brothers.

Ted tells Eddie the story of the car accident that killed his sons. He suggests his and Marion's drunkenness and Ted's failure to remove snow from the tail and turn signal lights likely contributed to their sons' deaths. He gives vivid detail, to help Eddie understand Marion's intense despair. Ted does not fully comprehend why Marion left, repeating, "What kind of mother leaves her daughter?"

At the end of the story, while playing squash alone on his court, Ted stops, looks into the camera with resignation, then lifts the door in the floor and descends.

Cast

Production
In reference to her sex scene with 18-year-old Jon Foster, Kim Basinger said she was concerned because of the actor's age. "I'm so fond of him and protective of him which is just the opposite to most of these situations because usually I've worked with men who are very protective of me. So this was quite the reverse. But Jon was a trooper, just a lovely guy," Basinger said.

Talking about her full frontal nude scene at 48, Mimi Rogers admitted it was "a little scary," but once she worked out all the particulars with helmer Tod Williams, the clothes came right off.

Reception
On review aggregator website Rotten Tomatoes, the film holds an approval rating of 67% based on 144 reviews, and an average rating of 6.46/10. The website's critical consensus reads, "Though uneven in tone, this is one of the better adaptations of John Irving's novels, with Jeff Bridges giving one of his best performances." On Metacritic, the film has a weighted average score of 67 out of 100, based on 38 critics, indicating "generally favorable reviews".

A. O. Scott of The New York Times called the film "surely the best movie yet made from Mr. Irving's fiction" and added, "It may even belong in the rarefied company of movies that are better than the books on which they are based . . . If you examine the story closely, you can find soft spots of implausibility and cliché. But the shakiness of some of the film's central ideas . . . matters far less than it might . . . The Door in the Floor nimbly shifts between melodrama and comedy, with a delightful and perfectly executed excursion into high farce near the end, and it seems perpetually to be discovering new possibilities for its characters . . . Mr. Foster and Ms. Basinger are both very good, but the film is dominated by Mr. Bridges' performance . . . [He] not only dominates the movie, he animates it. He is heroically life-size."

Peter Travers of Rolling Stone rated the film three-and-a-half out of four stars, calling it "extraordinary in every way, from the pitch-perfect performances to the delicate handling of explosive subject matter." He added, "It's bumpy going at times. But Williams is a talent to watch and a wonder with the actors. Basinger's haunted beauty burns in the memory – this is her finest work. And Bridges, one of the best actors on the planet, blends the contradictions of Ted . . . into an indelible portrait. You can't shut the door on this spellbinder. It gets into your head."

James Christopher of The Times observed, "What's strange about the film is that it's pitched like a play. There are no obvious ructions yet it bristles with small riddles and puzzling inconsistencies . . . The chemistry is absurd and tragic. Bridges is the obvious pull; Basinger is a one-note trauma. The story is curiously spellbinding, and fabulously ambivalent about their sins."

Awards and nominations
Jeff Bridges was nominated for the Independent Spirit Award for Best Lead Male but lost to Paul Giamatti for Sideways. Tod Williams was nominated for the Independent Spirit Award for Best Screenplay but lost to Alexander Payne and Jim Taylor for Sideways, and was nominated for the Golden Shell at the San Sebastian Film Festival but lost to Bahman Ghobadi for Turtles Can Fly. The film received the National Board of Review Award for Excellence In Filmmaking.

References

External links
 
 
 
 
 

2004 films
2004 comedy-drama films
American comedy-drama films
2000s English-language films
Films scored by Marcelo Zarvos
Films about writers
Films based on American novels
Films based on works by John Irving
Films directed by Tod Williams
Films set in New York (state)
Focus Features films
American independent films
2004 independent films
Films about adultery in the United States
Films produced by Anne Carey
Films about dysfunctional families
Films about grieving
2000s American films